Unboxed may refer to:
Being outside or removed from a box
Unboxed (Free Kitten album)
Unboxed: Creativity in the UK, 2022 innovation expo popularly known as the "Festival of Brexit"
Unboxed (Sammy Hagar album)